GCB Bioenergy: Bioproducts for a Sustainable Bioeconomy  is a monthly peer-reviewed scientific journal covering research on the interface between biological systems and the production of bioenergy, biofuels and bioproducts directly from plants, algae and waste. The editor-in-chief is Stephen P. Long, environmental plant physiologist, Fellow of the Royal Society and member of the National Academy of Sciences (University of Illinois and Lancaster University).

This journal is a sister journal to Global Change Biology.

External links

References 

Wiley-Blackwell academic journals
Bioenergy